The 1986 U.S. Open was the 86th U.S. Open, held June 12–15 at Shinnecock Hills Golf Club in Shinnecock Hills, New York. Raymond Floyd won his fourth and final major, two strokes ahead of runners-up Chip Beck and Lanny Wadkins. It was Floyd's only U.S. Open title and he became its oldest winner, a record he held for four years.

The opening round on Thursday had high winds with occasional heavy rain; the best score was Bob Tway's even-par 70, with Greg Norman a stroke behind. Norman led after 36 holes, and took the lead into the final round, a stroke ahead of Lee Trevino and Hal Sutton, but a 75 dropped him back six strokes to twelfth place. Norman led each of the four major championships in 1986 after 54 holes, but won just once, at the British Open.

During the final round, ten players either led or shared the lead; after Floyd birdied the par-3 11th, he was part of a nine-way tie for first. Floyd began the round three strokes back and separated himself from the pack with a bogey-free 66. After the birdie at 11, he saved par at 12, then recorded another birdie at 13 to tie for the lead. Floyd took sole possession of the lead after the 14th, then added another birdie at the 16th. After finishing his round, he was two strokes ahead of his closest pursuers: Wadkins and Beck both shot 65 to climb the leaderboard and shared second place. They tied the course record, set earlier in the day by Mark Calcavecchia.

It was Floyd's fourth and final major championship, and he only won twice more in his career. At age 46, Masters champion Jack Nicklaus overcame an opening round 77 and tied for eighth, his last top-ten finish at the U.S. Open. Hale Irwin won his third U.S. Open at age 45 in 1990 in a playoff and remains the oldest champion; in 1986, he was the only former champion in the field to miss the cut. Boros remained the oldest winner of a modern major at age 48 at the PGA Championship in 1968, until Phil Mickelson broke the record to become the oldest winner of a major at age 50 at the PGA Championship in 2021.

Entering this championship, Floyd had played in 21 U.S. Opens and had only two finishes in the top ten. His best result was a tie for sixth in 1965; he finished eighth in 1971, fifteen years earlier. His winner's share in 1986 was more than double his previous career earnings at the U.S. Open.

It was the second U.S. Open at Shinnecock Hills, which previously hosted 90 years earlier in 1896. The championship returned in 1995, 2004, and 2018.

Course layout

Source:

Past champions in the field

Made the cut

Missed the cut

Round summaries

First round
Thursday, June 12, 1986

Second round
Friday, June 13, 1986

Amateurs: Randolph (+10), Fleming (+11), Watts (+17), Lewis (+22), Daly (+24)

Third round
Saturday, June 14, 1986

Final round
Sunday, June 15, 1986

Source:Amateur: Randolph (+11).

Scorecard

Cumulative tournament scores, relative to par
{|class="wikitable" span = 50 style="font-size:85%;
|-
|style="background: Pink;" width=10|
|Birdie
|style="background: PaleGreen;" width=10|
|Bogey
|}

References

External links
GolfCompendium.com: 1986 U.S. Open
GolfStats.com; 1986 U.S. Open
USOpen.com – 1986

U.S. Open (golf)
Golf in New York (state)
Sports in Long Island
U.S. Open
U.S. Open (golf)
U.S. Open golf
U.S. Open (golf)